Letterkenny (CDR) railway station served the town of Letterkenny in County Donegal, Ireland.

The station opened on 1 January 1909 when the County Donegal Railways Joint Committee built the Strabane and Letterkenny Railway from Strabane to Letterkenny.

The station was built adjacent to the existing Letterkenny (LLS) railway station operated by the Londonderry and Lough Swilly Railway and had a siding connection to the system of this company.

It closed on 1 January 1960.

The station building is now used by Bus Eireann.

Routes

References

Disused railway stations in County Donegal
Railway stations opened in 1909
Railway stations closed in 1960
County Donegal Railways